The canton of Ballan-Miré is an administrative division of the Indre-et-Loire department, central France. Its borders were not modified at the French canton reorganisation which came into effect in March 2015. Its seat is in Ballan-Miré.

It consists of the following communes:
Ballan-Miré
Berthenay
Druye
La Riche
Saint-Genouph
Savonnières
Villandry

Notable people
Michel Lezeau, mayor 1977-2007

References

Cantons of Indre-et-Loire
Centre region articles needing translation from French Wikipedia